Fabien Lainé (born 15 April 1976) is a French politician representing the MoDem. He became a Member of the National Assembly on 5 October 2018, representing Landes's 1st constituency.

Early life and education 

Fabien Lainé is Construction's Salesman.

Political career

Mayor of Sanguinet 

After the municipal elections of 2014, Fabien Lainé was elected Mayor of Sanguinet. He resigned to comply with the law on the Cumulation of mandates and left his place to Raphaëlle Miremon. He remained a member of the municipal council.

Member of the National Assembly 

He was the substitute candidate for Geneviève Darrieussecq  for Landes's 1st constituency at the 2017 National Assembly election.  Following Darrieussecq's appointment to the government on June 21, 2017  he became a member of the National Assembly.

In the National Assembly, Fabien Lainé sits on the National Defence and Armed Forces Committee. He is also a President of the Hunting and territories's Working Group; and France-Singapore Friendship Group.

See also
 2017 French legislative election

References

1976 births
Living people
People from Arcachon
Deputies of the 15th National Assembly of the French Fifth Republic
Democratic Movement (France) politicians
Politicians from Nouvelle-Aquitaine